Kenneth Bron (born 1 November 1961), known professionally as Kenny B, is a Surinamese reggae singer who lives in the Netherlands.

Biography
Bron, a former servant of the Surinamese army, is inspired by Bob Marley. He began his career in English and Sranan before being persuaded to sing in Dutch.   
Kenny B signed to the TopNotch-label and released his album Kenny B in May 2015. It topped the Dutch Album Chart for one week. The second single Parijs chronicled a by-chance-meeting with a Dutch girl in Paris who barely speaks French. It spent seven weeks on top of the Dutch Top 40 chart and gave rise to parody-versions.

In 2016, Kenny B recorded two collaboration-singles; one with rapper/tv-presenter Ali B and R&B-singer Brace, the other, a translated cover-version of 54-46 That's My Number with established pop/reggae-band Doe Maar. He also provided the Dutch voice of Tamatoa in the Moana-movie and wrote a song for children's choir Kinderen voor Kinderen. 

In 2017, Kenny B participated in the tv-contest Beste Zangers (Best Singers).

Kenny B performs in and outside Dutch-speaking countries, and is a copyright-ambassador for other Surinamese artists. In 2019 he released the follow-up to his self-titled album and had his tenth no.1-hit on Surinamese station Radio 10 Magic FM.

Discography

Albums 
 Bosie mie (2009)
 The Best of 2011
 Kenny B (2015)
 Hoe Dan Ook (2019)

Filmography

Films 

 Moana (2016) - Dutch version
 Sing Song (2017)
 Soul (2020) - Dutch version

References

External links 
 

1961 births
Living people
20th-century Surinamese male singers
21st-century Dutch male singers
21st-century Dutch singers
Reggae singers
Dancehall singers
People from Paramaribo
Surinamese emigrants to the Netherlands